Live at the Astoria is a live concert video by the English rock group Radiohead, taken from their performance at the London Astoria on 27 May 1994.  It features performances of songs from their first two albums, Pablo Honey (1993) and The Bends (1995). It was released on VHS on 13 May 1995, the same day as the release of The Bends. A DVD release followed in 2005. The performance of "My Iron Lung" was used for The Bends, with Thom Yorke's vocals replaced and the audience removed.

Following Radiohead's purchase of its entire back catalogue from EMI in April 2016, the full concert was released for free on the band's public library and later premiered it on their official YouTube channel in 2020.

Release
The DVD edition of Live At The Astoria, digitally restored and remastered, was released on 21 November 2005 in Europe and on 22 November 2005 in North America.

To be included on the bonus discs of the collector's editions of Pablo Honey and The Bends, the concert was split between the two. "You", "Ripcord", "Creep", "Prove Yourself", "Vegetable", "Stop Whispering", "Anyone Can Play Guitar", "Pop Is Dead" and "Blow Out" were included on the re-release of Pablo Honey. Whereas "Bones", "Black Star", "The Bends", "My Iron Lung", "Maquiladora", "Fake Plastic Trees" "Just", and "Street Spirit (Fade Out)" featured on the re-release of The Bends.

Setlist
 "You" (3:48)
 "Bones" (3:08)
 "Ripcord" (3:17)
 "Black Star" (3:44)
 "Creep" (4:10)
 "The Bends" (3:56)
 "My Iron Lung" (5:06)
 "Prove Yourself" (2:24)
 "Maquiladora" (3:16)
 "Vegetable" (3:14)
 "Fake Plastic Trees" (4:29)
 "Just" (3:43)
 "Stop Whispering" (5:16)
 "Anyone Can Play Guitar" (4:16)
 "Street Spirit (Fade Out)" (4:24)
 "Pop Is Dead" (2:22)
 "Blow Out" (6:14)

Personnel
All songs written by Radiohead and published by Warner Chappell Music Ltd.
 Thom Yorke - vocals, guitar
 Jonny Greenwood - guitar
 Colin Greenwood - bass guitar
 Ed O'Brien - guitar, backing vocals
 Philip Selway - drums
 Dianne Swann Keys on Street Spirit (Fade Out)
 Jim Warren - mixing
 Brett Turnbull - director
 Sarah Bayliss  - producer
 Stanley Donwood & The White Chocolate Farm - artwork

References

Radiohead video albums
1995 video albums
Live video albums
1995 live albums
Radiohead live albums
Parlophone live albums
Parlophone video albums
EMI Records live albums
EMI Records video albums